The statue of Emmeline Pankhurst (officially called Rise up, Women, and also known as Our Emmeline) is a bronze sculpture in St Peter's Square, Manchester, depicting Emmeline Pankhurst, a British political activist and leader of the suffragette movement in the United Kingdom. Hazel Reeves sculpted the figure and designed the Meeting Circle that surrounds it.

The statue was unveiled on 14 December 2018, the centenary of the 1918 United Kingdom general election, the first election in the United Kingdom in which women over the age of 30 could vote. It is the first statue honouring a woman erected in Manchester since a statue of Queen Victoria was dedicated more than 100 years ago.

The WoManchester Statue Project
The statue was created following a five-year campaign called the WoManchester Statue Project. This was led by Manchester City councillor Andrew Simcock. He had initiated the campaign following a meeting in March 2014 with his friend Anne-Marie Glennon in the Sculpture Hall in Manchester Town Hall. Over coffee she had commented "these (busts) are all men. Where are the women!"

Simcock's campaign was also inspired by a craftivism exhibition held at Manchester Town Hall during February and March 2014. Frustrated by the gender imbalance in Manchester's civic statues, Warp & Weft (artist Helen Davies and heritage researcher Jenny White) devised the Stature project, yarnbombing eight male portrait busts with crochet masks depicting local historical women of achievement.

Councillor Simcock invited Warp & Weft to restage their exhibition on 30 July 2014, the day Manchester City Council gave its unanimous backing to his resolution that a 'statue of a woman of significance to Manchester' be created.

Initially a 20-strong list of women was compiled for consideration for the statue:

In June 2015, Simcock cycled from Land's End to John o' Groats in 20 stages, each one devoted to one of the women on the list.

A shortlist was created in the autumn of 2015 and Emmeline Pankhurst was decisively selected following a vote by thousands of people across the world.

The unveiling was attended by 6,000 people including many who had marched from the Pankhurst Centre near Manchester Royal Infirmary. It was here, as the then home of the Pankhurst family, that the Women's Social and Political Union had been formed.

The event marked exactly 100 years since the first women voted and stood as candidates in a general election. Two marches started from two symbolic locations – the People's History Museum and the Pankhurst Centre – ending up at St Peter's Square, which was attended by 6,000 people including 1,000 local schoolchildren. In July 2018, the Portland stone Pankhurst Meeting Circle was unveiled, designed to encircle the bronze statue. 

The statue was funded by corporate sponsors Manchester Airport Group and Property Alliance Group and from the sale of a limited number of bronze maquettes of the statue. A significant donation also came from the Government's Centenary Fund (Centenary Cities).

First in the Fight
In November 2019, a book was published chronicling the history of the WoManchester Statue Campaign and the 20 women on the original long list for consideration. First in the Fight by Helen Antrobus and Andrew Simcock contains essays on all 20 women plus the history of the campaign.

Maintenance of the statue
The WoManchester Statue campaign specifically set out to raise money covering the maintenance of the statue.

Award
In 2021, the statue won the Public Statues and Sculpture Association (PSSA) Marsh Award for Excellence in Public Sculpture.

See also 
 List of monuments and memorials to women's suffrage

References 

2018 sculptures
Monuments and memorials in Manchester
Pankhurst
Bronze sculptures in England
Pankhurst
Monuments and memorials to women's suffrage
Cultural depictions of Emmeline Pankhurst
Pankhurst